Kingena is an extinct genus of primarily Cretaceous-aged brachiopods of the family Kingenidae whose fossils are found in marine strata of Antarctica, Europe, and New Zealand. Early Paleocene-aged fossils from Denmark represent the youngest species.

Taxonomy 
Nearctic members have been excluded from this genus by Owen in 1970 and instead represent a separate genus, Waconella.

Select species 
 Kingena blackmorei Owen, 1970
 Kingena concinna Owen, 1970
 Kingena elegans Owen, 1970
 Kingena limburgica Simon, 2005
 Kingena mesembrina (Etheridge, 1913)
 Kingena pentangulata Woodward, 1833
 Kingena simiensis Waring, 1917

Sources

Terebratulida
Prehistoric brachiopod genera
Cretaceous brachiopods
Paleogene brachiopods
Cretaceous brachiopods of Europe
Paleocene animals of Europe
Extinct animals of Antarctica
Cretaceous genus first appearances
Maastrichtian genera
Danian genera
Paleocene genus extinctions